Suyash Prabhudessai (born 6 December 1997), is an Indian cricketer from Goa who plays for Goa in domestic matches and for the Royal Challengers Bangalore in the Indian Premier League (IPL). He made his List A debut for Goa in the 2016–17 Vijay Hazare Trophy on 28 February 2017. He made his first-class debut for Goa in the 2018–19 Ranji Trophy on 20 November 2018. He made his Twenty20 debut for Goa in the 2018–19 Syed Mushtaq Ali Trophy on 22 February 2019.

In February 2021, Prabhudessai was bought by the Royal Challengers Bangalore in the IPL auction ahead of the 2021 Indian Premier League. In February 2022, he was bought by the Royal Challengers Bangalore in the auction for the 2022 Indian Premier League tournament.

References

External links
 

1997 births
Living people
Indian cricketers
Goa cricketers
Royal Challengers Bangalore cricketers
Place of birth missing (living people)